The Smíchov Synagogue is the only functionalist synagogue in Prague; it was reconstructed to this style in 1931. After the World War II, the building was used for secular purposes because the Smíchov Jewish community ceased to exist in the Shoah. In the present, the building is used for an archive of the Jewish Museum in Prague.

Former appearance
The first synagogue of the Smíchov Jewish community was in ruins and dangerous for its visitors after only three years of use. The Jewish Community, indebted since the original building project and totally unprepared for another expense, gained financial means to replace the ruin with a new synagogue from Franz Ringhoffer II, Smíchov mayor, businessman (founder of the important Smíchov railway car factory) and surprisingly enough, a gentile.

The building was finished on 30 August 1863. Its outside was built in Romanesque Revival style while the inner space was formed in Moorish Revival style. The Smíchov Jewish Community belonged to reform rite; therefore there was a pump organ in the synagogue, yet later it was replaced by more representative organ. Capacity of the synagogue was more than 180 seats for men and about 140 seats for women. As for size, the synagogue was much smaller than synagogues in traditional areas of Jewish settlement – for instance, the Spanish Synagogue in Josefov, former Prague Jewish ghetto, has about 800 seats and seats of the Smíchov Synagogue would fill only the women section of this synagogue. The reason is plain enough – development of Jewish community in Smíchov was tightly interconnected with a boom of industry in Smíchov in the 19th century.

In 1897, the central government of the Austrian-Hungarian Empire failed to enforce a law that would guarantee equal rights to Czech- and German-speaking people. This unwelcome result caused riots in numerous Czech towns and cities including Prague and its vicinity. The violence was aimed against the considerable German population of the Czech lands and also against Jews who were considered pro-German at large. Before the rampages were suppressed, also by the aid of martial law, the Smíchov synagogue had been severely damaged. The situation was apparently so grave that also The New York Times informed about it.

Modern history 
Since the 1920s the Smíchov Jewish Community had looked for a site to build a new synagogue but because they did not succeed, they decided to rebuild the existing one. A modern purist design of 1930–31 by Leopold Ehrmann gave the synagogue a functionalist outside; the inner space was probably designed in Art Nouveau style. However, the renovated synagogue served religious purposes for only a decade.

In 1941, Nazi administrative of the country decided to use the building for storage of confiscated properties. After the World War II, the Smíchov Jewish Community was not re-established and the building passed to hands of a near factory Tatra, which used it as a warehouse. Some structural interventions were made (new concrete floor, change of storey disposition and construction of elevator), they caused damage to the synagogue and in 1986 it was proposed that it be demolished. This decision was not carried out, only because the synagogue was enlisted among historical architectural monuments.

After the Velvet Revolution, in 1990, the synagogue became a property of the Prague Jewish Community, which hired it to Jewish Museum in Prague in 1998. During following five years the synagogue was completely reconstructed. Nowadays, the Museum uses the building as an archive and a reading room. Self-supported structure provides space for this purpose, while the original disposition and decoration remains intact.

Inscription 
Quotation over the arcade attracts much attention. At the northern side there is "Peace, peace to him that is far off, and to him that is near" (Isaiah 57,19) in Czech, and at the western side "Not by might, nor by power, but by my spirit, saith the LORD of hosts" (Zechariah 4,6) in Hebrew. Gematrical value of the Hebrew inscription hints at date of reconstruction of the synagogue (5)691/1931.

Gallery

Literature and references 
 CHRASTILOVÁ, Jiřina, Zlomky z židovské Prahy, Praha: Havran, 2014, s. 206–208.
 KIEVAL, Hillel J., The making of Czech Jewry: National Conflict and Jewish Society in Bohemia, 1870–1918, New York: Oxford University Press, 1988.
 pořad Českého rozhlasu Vltava Synagogy Čech, Moravy a Slezska (5. část), jenž připravila Vladimíra LUKAŘOVÁ (odvysíláno v roce 2010).

External links 

Synagogues preserved as museums
Antisemitism in the Czech Republic
Synagogues completed in 1863
Moorish Revival synagogues
Art Nouveau synagogues
Synagogues in Prague
Orthodox synagogues
Jewish museums in the Czech Republic
Art Nouveau architecture in Prague
Functionalist synagogues
Modernist architecture in the Czech Republic
Synagogues completed in 1931
1863 establishments in Europe
Reform Judaism in the Czech Republic
Reform synagogues
Smíchov
19th-century religious buildings and structures in the Czech Republic